The Fontana del Pantheon (English: Fountain of the Pantheon) was commissioned by Pope Gregory XIII and is located in the Piazza della Rotonda, Rome, in front of the Roman Pantheon. It was designed by Giacomo Della Porta in 1575 and sculpted out of marble by Leonardo Sormani.

History
In 1711, Pope Clement XI requested that the fountain be modified and had Filippo Barigioni design a new layout, which included a different basin, made of stone, and the Macuteo obelisk, created during the period of Ramses II, set in the centre on a plinth with four dolphins decorating the base.

In 1886, the original marble figures were removed, and replaced with copies by Luigi Amici. Today, the originals can be seen in the Museum of Rome.

Fontana del Pantheon was the model to Francesco Robba for the Robba fountain, which stands at Town Square in Ljubljana, the capital of Slovenia. It is one of the city's most recognisable symbols.

Restoration
In April 2018 James Pallotta offered to donate €230,000 towards the restoration the fountain and also the fontana dei Leoni in Piazza del Popolo.

References

External links
 

Pantheon
Rome R. III Colonna
Rome R. VIII Sant'Eustachio
Rome R. IX Pigna
Dolphins in art